Lev Markovich Gatovsky (26 July 1903 – 18 April 1997) was a Soviet economist. He was the first economist that brought up the objective rules of the socialist economy by with his work: The Methodology of the Socialist Economy Theory, which was published in 1930.

External links
https://web.archive.org/web/20060831030711/http://www.etext.org/Politics/MIM/wim/wyl/hoxha/bland/ussrchap2.html
https://web.archive.org/web/20060829164715/http://www.etext.org/Politics/MIM/wim/wyl/hoxha/bland/ussrchap3.html
https://web.archive.org/web/20060513081831/http://website.lineone.net/~comleague/book/ussrchap6.html

1900s births
Soviet economists
Marxian economists
Year of death missing
Place of birth missing
Writers from Minsk